Derrick Smith (born September 26, 1991) is a United States Virgin Islands international soccer player who plays college soccer for the Pittsburgh Panthers, as a defender.

Career
Smith played college soccer for the Pittsburgh Panthers from 2011-2013.

He made his international debut for United States Virgin Islands in 2011, and has appeared in FIFA World Cup qualifying matches.

References

External links

1991 births
Living people
United States Virgin Islands soccer players
United States Virgin Islands international soccer players
Pittsburgh Panthers men's soccer players
People from Media, Pennsylvania
Soccer players from Pennsylvania
Association football defenders
Sportspeople from Delaware County, Pennsylvania